The William & Mary Tribe men's basketball team represents the College of William & Mary in Williamsburg, Virginia in NCAA Division I competition. The school's team competes in the Colonial Athletic Association and play their home games in Kaplan Arena. William and Mary Coach, Dane Fischer was hired as the 31st coach in school history following the dismissal of Coach Tony Shaver. Shaver served as the head coach from 2003–2019 and leads the school in all-time wins for a coach.

Postseason berths

NIT results
The Tribe have appeared in the National Invitation Tournament three times. Their combined record is 0–3.

NCAA results
 None (have never qualified)

The Tribe (an original Division I team since the NCAA division classification in 1948–49) are one of 45 Division I programs to have never appeared in the NCAA Division I men's basketball tournament. Of all Division I schools today that were charter members of this new classification, only William & Mary, The Citadel, Army, and St. Francis Brooklyn have never reached the NCAA men's basketball tournament at least once. The closest effort by the Tribe to reach the NCAA Tournament was a 75–74 loss in the 2014 CAA Tournament Final to Delaware. The Tribe also lost conference tournament championships in 1958, 1961, 1965, 1975, 1983, 2008, 2010, and 2015, now having gone 0–9 in NCAA Tournament berth-clinching games.

Recent seasons

Rivalries
William & Mary's traditional rivals have included in-state opponents Old Dominion University, James Madison University, the University of Richmond, Virginia Commonwealth University, and George Mason University. However, of these teams, none are still members of the Colonial Athletic Association. The Richmond Spiders, VCU Rams, and George Mason Patriots have all moved on to the Atlantic 10 Conference while the Old Dominion Monarchs left for Conference USA in 2013 and the James Madison Dukes left for the Sun Belt Conference in 2022. Some of these teams are maintained as part of William & Mary's out of conference schedule each year along with other Virginia schools like Virginia, Virginia Tech, Hampton, Radford, VMI, and Liberty.

Series records
Records through the 2019–20 season

Statistical leaders

NCAA records
Individual
 Bill Chambers – single game rebound total (51); occurred on February 14, 1953  vs. Virginia (rules changes since then make this record unlikely to be broken)

Accolades

Southern Conference (1936–1977)

ECAC South (1977–1982)
William & Mary joined the Colonial Athletic Association, its current conference, in 1982–83. The CAA's predecessor was the ECAC South, which existed between 1977–78 and 1984–85. The CAA recognizes the 1982–83 through 1984–85 seasons as part of its basketball history but not any earlier. The CAA was formally founded in 1982–83 as the ECAC South Basketball League.  It was renamed the Colonial Athletic Association in 1985–86 when it added championships in other sports (although a number of members maintain ECAC affiliation in some sports).

Colonial Athletic Association (1982–present)

Retired jerseys

William & Mary has retired six men's basketball jerseys in its program's history. Uniform numbers are not retired, only ceremonial jerseys. Banners depicting the all-time greats hang in the rafters of Kaplan Arena (the banner in white is for Lynn Norenberg, the only W&M women's basketball player to have a jersey retired). There also hang banners which commemorate their 1983 National Invitation Tournament and 2010 National Invitation Tournament bids.

Players in the NBA
This section is for William & Mary players who have appeared in at least one regular season or postseason NBA game.
 Andy Duncan – Rochester Royals, Boston Celtics (1947–1951)
 Nathan Knight – Atlanta Hawks (2020–2021), Minnesota Timberwolves (2021–present)
 Brant Weidner – San Antonio Spurs (1983–1984)

Players in international leagues
David Cohn (born 1995), American-Israeli player – Israeli Basketball Premier League
Andy Van Vliet (born 1995), Belgian player for Bnei Herzliya Basket - Israeli Basketball Premier League

References

External links
 

 
1905 establishments in Virginia